is a former Japanese football player.

Sudo previously played for Nagoya Grampus Eight and Yokohama FC in the J1 League and J2 League. Then he moved to Brazil and played for two clubs. He will retire at the end of 2015.

Club statistics

References

External links

1986 births
Living people
Association football people from Tokyo Metropolis
Japanese footballers
J1 League players
J2 League players
J3 League players
Japan Football League players
Nagoya Grampus players
Yokohama FC players
Matsumoto Yamaga FC players
Salgueiro Atlético Clube players
Tombense Futebol Clube players
FC Gifu players
SC Sagamihara players
Japanese expatriate footballers
Expatriate footballers in Brazil
Association football midfielders
People from Hino, Tokyo